Gabriel Armando de Abreu (born 26 November 1990), commonly known as Gabriel Paulista or simply Gabriel, is a Brazilian professional footballer who plays as a central defender for La Liga club Valencia.

He began his career with Vitória in 2010, winning two Campeonato Baiano titles and finishing as runner-up in the 2010 Copa do Brasil. He also spent a season-and-a-half in Spain's top flight with Villarreal before joining Arsenal in January 2015. In August 2017, Gabriel Paulista completed a move to Valencia.

Club career

Vitória
Born in São Paulo, Gabriel Paulista joined Vitória's youth setup in 2009 from Taboão da Serra, after having failed trials at Grêmio Barueri and Santos. He made his senior debut for the former on 7 March 2010, starting in a 3–1 win at Camaçari for the Campeonato Baiano championship, his only appearance in a season in which Vitória won the state title. He made his Série A debut on 15 May, replacing Vilson in a 1–1 home draw against Flamengo.

In August 2010, Gabriel Paulista appeared in both matches of 2010 Copa do Brasil finals against Santos, but playing as a right back in a 3–2 aggregate loss. On 5 December, in the last game of a league season which saw his team relegated, Gabriel was sent off for a foul on Anaílson in a goalless home draw against Atlético Goianiense.

He made his first team breakthrough in late 2011, and went on to play a crucial role in the following year, appearing in 35 matches as Leão returned to Série A. On 6 September 2012 Gabriel Paulista signed a contract extension with Vitória, until 2016.

He was elected the best central defender of 2013 Campeonato Baiano; he opened in a 7–3 win at city rivals Bahia on 12 May, in the first leg of the final (8–4 aggregate). On 25 May, in the opening game of the 2013 season, he scored his only goal in the national league, putting Vitória 2–0 up after 12 minutes against Internacional at the Arena Fonte Nova, an eventual 2–2 draw.

Villarreal
On 15 August 2013, Gabriel Paulista moved to La Liga outfit Villarreal, signing a five-year deal with the club. He made his debut in the competition on 10 November, starting in a 1–1 home draw against Atlético Madrid.

Gabriel Paulista featured in 18 league matches during his first season abroad, sharing terms with Chechu Dorado, as the Yellow Submarine finished sixth and subsequently returned to a European competition. He made his UEFA Europa League debut on 21 August 2014, starting in a 3–0 away win against FC Astana.

Profiting from Mateo Musacchio's injury, Gabriel Paulista also overtook Dorado and was made a starter in 2014–15. He formed a strong partnership with new signing Víctor Ruiz, with his side conceding only 17 goals in the 19 league matches in which he appeared.

Arsenal

On 26 January 2015, Gabriel Paulista was granted a work permit by the UK government and expected to join Arsenal for a fee of around £11.3 million. He signed for the club two days later, with Joel Campbell moving the other way on loan. Manager Arsène Wenger stated that despite the player's fitness, Gabriel could make errors in his first matches due to not being able to speak English.

Gabriel Paulista made his debut for Arsenal on 15 February, playing the entirety of a 2–0 home win over Middlesbrough in the fifth round of the FA Cup. He made his Premier League debut six days later, coming on for Alexis Sánchez in the final minute of a 2–1 win away to Crystal Palace.

Gabriel Paulista made his first full start in the Premier League in Arsenal's 2–0 home win over Everton on 1 March. He experienced a shaky start to the game but later executed a perfect sliding tackle on the goal-bound Romelu Lukaku, cleanly winning the ball. He was an unused substitute on 30 May, as Arsenal won the FA Cup Final 4–0 against Aston Villa at Wembley Stadium.

On 19 September 2015, Gabriel Paulista was sent off at Chelsea for a tussle with Diego Costa; Santi Cazorla was later dismissed as nine-man Arsenal lost 2–0. Gabriel initially received a standard three-match suspension for violent conduct after receiving a direct red card, but the decision was later withdrawn after a "wrongful dismissal claim"; he was however banned for one match and fined £10,000 for improper conduct by not leaving the pitch immediately.

On 28 December 2015, Gabriel Paulista scored his first  goal in European football, heading in Mesut Özil's corner kick to open a 2–0 win against Bournemouth; the result put the Gunners to the top of the Premier League.

Valencia
On 18 August 2017, Gabriel Paulista returned to Spain to join Valencia on a five-year contract. He made his debut on 9 September, in a 0–0 home draw against Atlético Madrid. On 20 January 2018, he was sent off for dissent in a 2–1 loss at UD Las Palmas, infuriating his manager Marcelino García Toral.

Gabriel Paulista played five games as Los Che won the 2018–19 Copa del Rey, including the 2–1 final win over Barcelona on 25 May; it was their first honour for eleven years. On 10 December 2019, he was sent off at the end of a 1–0 win at AFC Ajax in the last game of the Champions League group stage, for headbutting Dušan Tadić.

International career
On 20 March 2015, Gabriel Paulista was called up to the Brazil national team for the first time, replacing the injured David Luiz for friendly matches against France and Chile. However, he did not feature in either match. 

On 9 December 2020, Gabriel Paulista obtained Spanish nationality through residence, and made himself available to represent the Spain national team.

Career statistics

Honours
Arsenal
 FA Cup: 2014–15, 2016–17
 FA Community Shield: 2015

Valencia
 Copa del Rey: 2018–19

Individual
 Campeonato Baiano Best Central Defender: 2012, 2013

References

External links

Profile at the Valencia CF website
 
 

1990 births
Living people
Footballers from São Paulo
Brazilian footballers
Association football central defenders
Campeonato Brasileiro Série A players
Campeonato Brasileiro Série B players
Esporte Clube Vitória players
La Liga players
Villarreal CF players
Premier League players
Arsenal F.C. players
Valencia CF players
Brazilian expatriate footballers
Brazilian expatriate sportspeople in Spain
Expatriate footballers in Spain
Brazilian expatriate sportspeople in England
Expatriate footballers in England
Naturalised citizens of Spain